National Highway 114 (NH 114) starts from Jodhpur and ends at Pokhran, both places in the state of Rajasthan, India.

Route
National Highway 114 starts from its junction with NH-65 just north of Jodhpur.
 Agolai
 Balesar Satan
 Sekhala
 Shaitrawa (Setrawa)
 Dechu (Dechoo)
 Gumanpura
 Lawan
 Pokhran (Pokaran)

National Highway 114 terminates at its junction with NH-15, just northwest of Pokhran.

See also
 List of National Highways in India (by Highway Number)
 List of National Highways in India
 National Highways Development Project

References

External links
 NH network map of India

114|114
National highways in India (old numbering)